Nathaniel Page (born January 26, 1957) is an American former track and field athlete who began as a high jumper before concentrating on the 400 meters hurdles. He finished second in the high jump with 2.23 meters at the 1980 U.S. Olympic Trials, to qualify for the Moscow Olympics, which the American team boycotted.

His high jump best is 2.29 meters indoors, set in February 1981 in New York. His outdoor best is 2.28 meters, set in Brussels in August 1981. He switched to the hurdles in 1984 after an injury to his jumping leg. His 400 meters hurdles best of 48.75 secs was set in Verona in September 1989. He reached the 400m hurdles final at the U.S. Championships in seven out of eight years between 1985 and 1992 (he didn't compete in 1988).

As a senior at Evanston High School, Page broke his own Illinois High School Association record in the high jump by clearing 7 feet at the 1975 state meet. He was an All-American competitor at the University of Missouri, becoming the collegiate national high jump champion in 1979. That same year he broke the program record for the outdoor high jump at the U.S. Olympic Festival. He was inducted into the University of Missouri Athletics Hall of Fame in 1999.

Page married Jamaican sprinter Merlene Ottey in February 1984; they divorced in 1987. He earned his bachelor's degree in physical education at California State Polytechnic University, Pomona while serving as an assistant coach for the Broncos track team from 1988 to 1991. He subsequently joined the coaching staff at Georgia Tech in 1996. He was named the 2008 NCAA South Region Men’s Assistant Coach of the Year. Page was an assistant coach for Team USA at the 2020 Summer Olympics.

Achievements

International competitions

National titles
 NCAA Division I Men's Outdoor Track and Field Championships
 High jump: 1979

References

External links
 

1957 births
Living people
American male high jumpers
American male hurdlers
Competitors at the 1990 Goodwill Games
Missouri Tigers men's track and field athletes
California State Polytechnic University, Pomona alumni
American track and field coaches
Cal Poly Pomona Broncos track and field coaches
Georgia Tech Yellow Jackets track and field coaches
Sportspeople from Evanston, Illinois
Track and field athletes from Illinois